Paraliburnia is a genus of delphacid planthoppers in the family Delphacidae. There are about seven described species in Paraliburnia.

Species
These seven species belong to the genus Paraliburnia:
 Paraliburnia adela (Flor, 1861)
 Paraliburnia clypealis (Sahlberg, 1871)
 Paraliburnia furcata Hamilton, 2002
 Paraliburnia jacobseni Jensen-Haarup, 1917
 Paraliburnia kilmani (Van Duzee, 1897)
 Paraliburnia lecartus Hamilton, 2002
 Paraliburnia lugubrina (Boheman, 1847)

References

Further reading

 
 
 
 

Articles created by Qbugbot
Auchenorrhyncha genera
Delphacinae